The Fourth Constituent Charter is a resolution of the Council of People's Ministers of the Belarusian People's Republic of November 29, 1918 on the Establishment of Local Self-Government Institutions at the Volast, Paviet and Miesto Levels: "Let all the citizens of Belarus unite around the Council of the Belarusian People's Republic and the Belarusian Government and create their own parish, county and local Belarusian Councils throughout Belarus".

Text

See also 

 First Constituent Charter
 Second Constituent Charter

 Third Constituent Charter

References

Sources 

 Ustaŭnyja hramaty BNR, Rada of the Belarusian Democratic Republic

 
1918 in Belarus
Belarusian independence movement
1918 in law
1918 documents
1918 in international relations
Dissolution of the Russian Empire
November 1918 events